PIH can refer to:

Partners In Health, health organization
Permanent income hypothesis, an economic model
Pipeline Induction Heat (PIH), coating provider for oil and gas pipelines
Pocatello Regional Airport
Pregnancy-induced hypertension
Pitkern language, ISO 639-3 code